Afton is a former community in San Bernardino County, California, United States. It was a station on the San Pedro, Los Angeles and Salt Lake Railroad, established in 1904, home to a number of railroad employees.

References

Former settlements in San Bernardino County, California
Former populated places in California